Elections for Richmond upon Thames Borough Council were held on 22 May 2014.  Elections to the European Parliament took place on the same day.

In London council elections the entire council is elected every four years.

Summary of results

Ward Results

Barnes

East Sheen

Fulwell & Hampton Hill

Ham, Petersham & Richmond Riverside

Hampton

Hampton North

Hampton Wick

Heathfield

Kew

Mortlake & Barnes Common

North Richmond

South Richmond

South Twickenham

St Margarets & North Twickenham

Teddington

Twickenham Riverside

West Twickenham

Whitton

References

2014
Richmond upon Thames